Regius Professor of Surgery may refer to:
Regius Professor of Surgery (Aberdeen)
Regius Professor of Surgery (Dublin)
Regius Chair of Clinical Surgery, Edinburgh
Regius Professor of Surgery (Glasgow)